Nocardioides ginsengisoli is a Gram-positive, rod-shaped and non-spore-forming bacterium from the genus Nocardioides which has been isolated from soil from a ginseng field in Pocheon, Korea.

References

Further reading

External links
Type strain of Nocardioides ginsengisoli at BacDive -  the Bacterial Diversity Metadatabase	

ginsengisoli
Bacteria described in 2011